Gehyra wongchan is a species of gecko endemic to Thailand.

References

Gehyra
Reptiles described in 2022
Geckos of Thailand